eNetBot Mail was the first email utility created to provide AOL users with access to their e-mail from a POP3 Email client such as Microsoft Outlook Express.

This program was used by thousands of AOL customers between 1999 and 2004. In 2004 AOL opened up their servers through an IMAP interface enabling AOL customers to read AOL mail from any email client supporting IMAP without having to use eNetBot Mail.

eNetBot Mail was referred by Walter Mossberg of Wall Street Journal more than once in his technology columns.

External links
www.enetbot.com

References

Email clients